Edward Sedgwick (November 7, 1889 – March 7, 1953) was an American film director, writer, actor and producer.

Early life
He was born in Galveston, Texas, the son of Edward Sedgwick, Sr. and Josephine Walker, both stage actors. At the age of four, young Edward Sedgwick joined his show business family in what was then the Sedgwick Comedy Company, a vaudeville act, doing a "singing speciality". He played child parts and did vaudeville acts until he was seven, when he was given his first comedy part, that of an Irish immigrant, in a comedy written by his father called Just Over.

During this time, he was only on stage during the summer months. In winter his father took him back to Galveston and sent him to school. He graduated from St. Mary's University of Galveston, and was then sent to  the Peacock Military Academy in San Antonio, from which he graduated with the rank of first lieutenant. After graduation, he seriously contemplated a military life but the lure of the stage proved stronger and so he rejoined his father's company, now known as "The Five Sedgwicks." The troupe consisted of his parents, himself and his two sisters. Forced to close the act through the father's illness, Sedgwick went into musical comedy and soon had a company of his own, known as "The Cabaret Girls," produced, directed and managed by himself. The company was very successful, and it was only after repeated offers from Romaine Fielding that he was induced, at the end of his third successful season, to disband his company and become a film-actor.

The two other family members were Edward's twin sisters Eileen and Josie, who both later pursued successful silent-movie acting careers. Sedgwick broke into films as a comedian in 1915, frequently cast as a zany baseball player. He then became a serial director six years later in 1921, and moved on to the Tom Mix western unit. Sedgwick's love of baseball came in handy for the ballpark sequences of Mix's Stepping Out, Buck Jones’ Hit and Run, William Haines’ Slide, Kelly, Slide, Buster Keaton’s The Cameraman, and Robert Young’s Death on the Diamond.

Career
Sedgwick signed with MGM in the late 1920s. There, he found a kindred spirit in fellow baseball buff Buster Keaton. Sedgwick (known informally as "Ed" or "Junior") directed most of Keaton's MGM features: The Cameraman, Spite Marriage, Free and Easy, Doughboys (in which Sedgwick appears on screen as a dumb soldier), Parlor, Bedroom and Bath, Speak Easily, and What! No Beer?. In 1936 Sedgwick briefly became a producer-director at Hal Roach Studios. There, he made Mister Cinderella and Pick a Star, both starring Jack Haley. The latter film featured a guest appearance by Laurel and Hardy.

He directed the 1938 film The Gladiator starring Joe E. Brown and Dickie Moore.

By the 1940s, Sedgwick had fewer opportunities to direct. When Laurel and Hardy returned to MGM in late 1942, Sedgwick was chosen to direct them in Air Raid Wardens. It was his last assignment for five years, but he remained on the MGM payroll, sharing an office with the almost-as-idle Buster Keaton.

In 1948, Keaton, employed as a gagman for Red Skelton, had suggested that Sedgwick would be an ideal director for the upcoming A Southern Yankee. But Sedgwick was not up to the challenge: though he received sole directorial credit, S. Sylvan Simon directed the film in its entirety. Sedgwick's final released film was Universal's Ma and Pa Kettle Back on the Farm.

Sedgwick's 1923 silent film The First Degree was long thought to have been a lost film until a complete copy was discovered at the Chicago Film Archives, part of a collection of agricultural films donated from Peoria, IL. Chicago Film Archives has preserved and digitally transferred the film.

Death
 
Sedgwick died of a heart attack in North Hollywood, California at the age of 63. He is buried in Holy Cross Cemetery in Culver City.

Filmography

 The Haunted Pajamas (1917)
 Fantômas (1920)
 Live Wires (1921)
 The Rough Diamond (1921)
 Bar Nothing (1921)
 Boomerang Justice (1922)
 The Bearcat (1922)
 The Flaming Hour (1922)
 Chasing the Moon (1922)
 Do and Dare (1922)
 Out of Luck (1923)
 Romance Land (1923)
 Single Handed (1923)
 The Gentleman from America (1923)
 Dead Game (1923)
 Shootin' for Love (1923)
 The First Degree (1923)
 Blinky (1923)
 The Ramblin' Kid (1923)
 The Thrill Chaser (1923)
 Hook and Ladder (1924)
 Ride for Your Life (1924)
 40-Horse Hawkins (1924)
 Broadway or Bust (1924)
 The Sawdust Trail (1924)
 Hit and Run (1924)
 The Ridin' Kid from Powder River (1924)
 The Hurricane Kid (1925)
 The Saddle Hawk (1925)
 Let 'er Buck (1925)
 Lorraine of the Lions (1925)
 The Phantom of the Opera (1925)
 Two-Fisted Jones (1925)
 The Runaway Express (1926)
 Tin Hats (1926)
 The Flaming Frontier (1926)
 Under Western Skies (1926)
 There You Are! (1926)
 Slide, Kelly, Slide (1927)
 The Bugle Call (1927)
 Spring Fever (1927)
 West Point (1927)
 Circus Rookies (1928)
 The Cameraman (1928)
 Spite Marriage (1929)
 Free and Easy (1930)
 Estrellados (1930)
 Doughboys (1930)
 Remote Control (1930)
 Parlor, Bedroom and Bath (1931)
 Maker of Men (1931)
 A Dangerous Affair (1931)
 The Big Shot (1931)
 The Passionate Plumber (1932)
 Speak Easily (1932)
 What! No Beer? (1933)
 Horse Play (1933)
 Saturday's Millions (1933)
 The Poor Rich (1934)
 I'll Tell the World (1934)
 Death on the Diamond (1934)
 Here Comes the Groom (1934)
 Father Brown, Detective (1934)
 Murder in the Fleet (1935)
 The Virginia Judge (1935)
 Mr. Cinderella (1936)
 Pick a Star (1937)
 Riding on Air (1937)
 Fit for a King (1937)
 The Gladiator (1938)
 Burn 'Em Up O'Connor (1939)
 Beware Spooks! (1939)
 So You Won't Talk (1940)
 Air Raid Wardens (1943)
 Easy to Wed (1946)
 A Southern Yankee (1948)
 Excuse My Dust (1951)
 Ma and Pa Kettle Back on the Farm (1951)
 I Love Lucy (1953)

References

External links

1889 births
1953 deaths
Male actors from Texas
Film producers from Texas
American male silent film actors
American male screenwriters
Burials at Holy Cross Cemetery, Culver City
People from Galveston, Texas
Film directors from Texas
20th-century American male actors
Screenwriters from Texas
20th-century American male writers
20th-century American screenwriters